Sultana Daku may refer to:

 Sultana Daku (1972 film), a 1972 Bollywood drama film
 Sultana Daku (1975 film), a Pakistani biographical and musical film

See also
 The Confession of Sultana Daku, a 2009 historical novel by Sujit Saraf